William A. Smith (November 19, 1870 – June 10, 1958) was a justice of the Iowa Supreme Court from January 1, 1943, to June 10, 1958, appointed from Dubuque County, Iowa.

References

External links

Justices of the Iowa Supreme Court
1870 births
1958 deaths